Agafokleya A. Poltoratskaya (1737-1822), was a Russian entrepreneur and major landowner. She and her spouse Mark Poltoratsky were the founders of the noble family of Poltoratsky. She was a major business person and landowner of her time, and created a substantial fortune which helped her spouse attain nobility. She was a great contributor to the church, and also infamous because of her alleged great mistreatment of her serfs, which reportedly led Emperor Alexander of Russia to have her prosecuted.

References
 Газета «Тверская жизнь». Агафоклея: железная леди, живая душа.

1737 births
1822 deaths
18th-century businesspeople from the Russian Empire
Russian women in business
19th-century businesspeople from the Russian Empire
Russian landowners
18th-century landowners
19th-century landowners